Open House Brno (OHB) is a free weekend festival held annually in Brno that allows participants to visit dozens of buildings that are not typically open to the public. Every visit is free of charge. It is part of a worldwide network of Open House events, that started with Open House London in 1992,in 2003 followed Open House New York and other cities as for example later in 2011 Open House Chicago.

Edition 2018 
For the first full scale event in 2018, 23 locations participated, and event attracted around 8,000 people.

Edition 2019 
Second year of the event in 2019 was attended in person by Victoria Thornton, founder of Open House Worldwide. Included were Educational workshops "Human Ant-hill," a special program for children – architectural-learning fun – and there are also guided tours for English and German speaking visitors. The festival lead architecture fans, not only through the city centre, where doors to the former Moravian Parliament and the renovated palaces and villas will be thrown open, but also to the more remote parts of the city. There are civil engineering structures, residential structures and industrial buildings with an panoramatic view or a unique design.

Edition 2020 
The COVID-19 pandemic has limited personal attendance possibilities, thus the online version of the festival was performed on 23rd–24th April 2020. The Autumn edition was presented as the spring festival replacement. Once again was realized solely online 10th–11th October 2020

Filming and Workshops were prepared by a group of volunteers and students from Masaryk and Mendel Universities. Results were published on YouTube channel and Facebook.
The industrial focus was emphasized e.g. presented was Edison’s power station, which was used for the first European electrified Theatre. One of the most popular recordings was Dada district residential lofts

Virtual visits were enabled to almost 50 locations across the city. There were presented pre-recorded guided tours, panoramas, 3D walks and 360 walks. Streaming gained quite positive reviews, about 14ts views on Facebook and about 6ts views on freshly established Youtube channel. Traditional entry was enabled only to restricted groups of volunteers. 

Open House Brno participated on Open House Worldwide online festival, 48 hours over the weekend of 14–15 November. OHB presented section Spiritual places, for which were prepared Brno Synagogue and Rainbow jewel is Catholic Church of Maria Restituta Kafka, consecrated just in September 2020. The event had widespread media attention.

Structure 
Open House Brno is organized by nonprofit organization Spolek Culture&Management. In the years 2017 – 2020 was main partner TIC Brno.

Gallery

References 

Brno
Tourist attractions in the South Moravian Region
Czech culture
Buildings and structures in Brno